Alexander Frey (7 June 1877 Vehkalahti - 28 November 1945 Helsinki) was a Finnish senator, banker and was in the Finnish delegation of Treaty of Tartu between Finland and Russia. He was in Finnish parliament from 1916 to 1917. Frey was a Chairman of the Board  in Pohjoismaiden Yhdyspankki (nowadays part of Nordea) in 1928 - 1945.

References

External links
 Finnish MP register

1877 births
1945 deaths
People from Hamina
People from Viipuri Province (Grand Duchy of Finland)
Swedish People's Party of Finland politicians
Finnish senators
Members of the Parliament of Finland (1916–17)
People of the Finnish Civil War (White side)